A45 or A-45 may refer to:
 A45 Infantry Support Tank, the chassis of which was developed into the Conqueror tank
 A45 Records, a German record label notably producing the band Real McCoy
 Article 45 Concern Group, a political party in Hong Kong
 Indian Defence, Encyclopaedia of Chess Openings code
 A45 AMG, a performance compact car produced by Mercedes-Benz
 Sisu A-45, a Finnish military truck

Roads
 A45 road, a road connecting Birmingham and Thrapston in England
 Autovía A-45, a road connecting Malaga and Cordoba in Spain
 Bundesautobahn 45, a road connecting Dortmund and Aschaffenburg in Germany
 A45 autoroute, a proposed motorway connecting Lyon and Saint-Étienne in France